The Pacific Wrestling Federation (PWF) United States Heavyweight Championship is a former title defended in All Japan Pro Wrestling.

Creation of the title
The title was established in 1970 when The Destroyer, who held the Hawaii version of the NWA North American Heavyweight Championship, had the belt which would become the PWF United States Championship made to replace the original North American title belt, which had fallen into disrepair. The Destroyer then embarked on a world tour, on which he was billed as United States Champion. The title ended up becoming an official Pacific Wrestling Federation title later on, and was retired in 1979 when Destroyer decided to return to the United States.

Title history

See also

All Japan Pro Wrestling
PWF Heavyweight Championship
PWF Tag Team Championship

Footnotes

References
Wrestling-Titles.com

All Japan Pro Wrestling championships
Heavyweight wrestling championships
NWA United States Heavyweight Championships